Damien Marchesseault (or Marchesseau) (April 1, 1818 – January 20, 1868) was the seventh Mayor of Los Angeles from May 9, 1859 to May 9, 1860 and then again from  January 7, 1861  to May 6, 1865. Marchesseault assumed the office one last time interrupting Cristobal Aguilar's first term in office for three months.

Biography
Born in St.-Antoine-sur-Richelieu, Quebec,  Canada, Marchesseault was described as a carousing onetime New Orleans gambler. With Victor Beaudry, he started an ice vending company using ice from what is now known as Icehouse Canyon near Mount San Antonio.

During his term as Zanjero of Los Angeles (water steward), Marchesseault and a partner laid wooden water pipes that burst and turned streets into sinkholes.

Struggling with mounting debts, he slipped into an empty Los Angeles City Hall Council chamber on Jan. 20, 1868, and shot himself to death.

Marcheassault Street in Los Angeles is named for him.

Death and suicide note

The following is a news article about Damien Marchesseault's death that includes the suicide note he wrote to his wife, Mary Clark Marchesseault, taken from the January 21, 1868, issue of  the Los Angeles Semi-Weekly News:

Died. ---Damien Marchesseault, for several years Mayor of this city, died at the Mayors office, about 7 o'clock AM, on the 20th INS.

Mr. Marchesseault was a native of Canada, and in early life immigrated to New Orleans, where he has a brother now living. He was in Mexico during the Mexican War, and came to this country in 1849, and settled in this city in 1853; where  was for several years engaged in business. He was a man of remarkable energy, of strong convictions, and naturally had many enemies, but leaves a host of friends. The friends and acquaintances of the deceased are requested to attend the funeral at 10 o'clock this morning, from his late residence.

Suicide. -Damien Marchesseault committed suicide on yesterday morning by shooting himself, the ball entering near the nose, and passing into the brain.

The following letter was found upon the table near the late Damien Marchesseault, addressed to Mrs. Marchesseault; and was placed in our hands for publication by the friends of that lady:Office of the City Marshal, Los Angeles City, January 20, 1868.My Dear Mary: - By my drinking to excess, and gambling also, I have involved myself to the amount of about three thousand dollars which I have borrowed from time to time from friends and acquaintances. Under the promise to return the same the following day, which I have often failed to do. To such an extend have I gone in this way that I am now ashamed to meet my fellow man on the street; besides that, I have deeply wronged you as a husband, by spending my money instead of maintaining you as it becomes a husband to do. Though you have never complained of my miserable conduct, you nevertheless have suffered too much. I therefore, to save you from further disgrace and trouble, being that I cannot maintain you respectably, I shall end this state of thing this very morning. Of course, in all this, there is no blame attached contrary you have asked me to permit you to earn money honestly by teaching and I refused. You have always been true to me. If I write these few lines, it is to set you a night before this wicked world, to keep slander from blaming you in any manner whatever. Now, my dear beloved, I hope that you will pardon me, and also Mr. Sainsevain. It is time to part, God bless you, and may you be happy yet, your husband Damien Marchesseault.

References

 Chronological Record of Los Angeles City Officials: 1850—1938, Compiled under Direction of Municipal Reference Library City Hall, Los Angeles March 1938 (Reprinted 1966)

Mayors of Los Angeles
Los Angeles Common Council (1850–1889) members
19th-century American politicians
1818 births
1868 deaths
American politicians who committed suicide
Suicides by firearm in California
American people of Québécois descent
Pre-Confederation Canadian emigrants to the United States
People from Montérégie